The Edwin Stevens Lecture, also known as the Edwin Stevens Lecture for the Laity or Stevens Lecture, are a series of lectures founded and named for Arthur Edwin Stevens in 1970. Stevens was a successful entrepreneur and member of the library section of the Royal Society of Medicine (RSM), London, where the lecture is held every year. In 1967, a committee to discuss "lectures for the laity" was formed. In 1970, at the request of the then president of the History of Medicine Society, Sir Terence Cawthorne, Stevens donated £2,000 a year for the first three years, as a trial. The lectures became successful and Stevens donated a further £50,000 in 1973 and made the lecture series permanent.

Lectures

1970-1980

1981-1990

1991-2000

2001-2010

2011-2021

References

External links

Annual events in London
British lecture series
Lists of physicians
Medical education in the United Kingdom
Medical lecture series
Royal Society of Medicine